Ivanivske may refer to:

 , Ukraine
 , Ukraine
 , Ukraine
 , Ukraine
 , Ukraine
 Lotykove, a town in Luhansk Oblast, Ukraine, officially renamed to Ivanivske in 2016

See also 
 Ivanovsky (disambiguation)